Michele Clarke may refer to:

Michéle Clarke (born 1963), South African politician
Michèle Pearson Clarke (born 1973), Canadian filmmaker
Michele Clarke (footballer) (born 1982), New Zealand footballer